The Air Zoo, founded as the Kalamazoo Aviation History Museum, is an aviation museum and indoor amusement park next to the Kalamazoo-Battle Creek International Airport in Portage, Michigan. The Air Zoo holds many historical and rare aircraft, including the world's fastest air-breathing aircraft, the SR-71B Blackbird. Many of its antique planes are airworthy. Among its other attractions are a 180-degree theater that projects a 2-D film simulation of a B-17 bombing mission during World War II; and various amusement rides, including flight simulators of a rocket trip to Mars, a U.S. Navy (former Blue Angel) F/A-18 Hornet, a stunt biplane, a hot air balloon, a veteran U.S. Navy F-14A Tomcat that served aboard USS America, and more. Air Zoo is a Smithsonian Affiliate.

History 

The Kalamazoo Aviation History Museum was founded in 1977 by former Women Airforce Service Pilots (WASPs), Sue Parish and WWII pilot Preston "Pete" Parish. The museum was dedicated to "preserving and displaying historical and military artifacts and to serving as a research and educational facility for this country and abroad." The doors opened on November 18, 1979 and the museum quickly developed into one of the 10 largest nongovernmental aviation museums in the United States.

In early 1999, the name Air Zoo was adopted. The name comes from the fact that so many of the planes in its collection have animal nicknames like Warhawk, Gooneybird, Wildcat, Bearcat, and Hellcat.

Also in early 1999, plans began for a major renovation. On April 25, 2003, construction began on a new  facility that doubled the museum's size and added flight simulators, amusement rides, Smithsonian Institution exhibitions, character actors, and a 4-D theater that combines 3-D films with special effects such as rocking chairs and plumes of smoke to simulate anti-aircraft fire.

The new facility opened in April 2004. It holds the world's largest hand-painted indoor mural: "Century of Flight", by aviation artist Rick Herter, a  tribute to the history of flight in the main entrance.

In June 2007, the Michigan Space & Science Center opened in the old building (East Campus). The building featured World War II aircraft, several artifacts from the defunct Jackson Space Center, and more.

On October 1, 2011, the Air Zoo expanded its Main Campus again, moving everything from the East Campus into the new 50,000-square-foot addition. Half of this new expansion (known as the "East Wing") is devoted to the Space Theme, while the other half of the add-on includes World War II aircraft. The East Campus is now being used as the Restoration Center, which is noted for its work on aircraft including a Douglas Dauntless, a Sopwith Camel, and the museum's latest project: An FM-2 Wildcat that had been lying at the bottom of Lake Michigan for 68 years.

In December 2020, the Air Zoo was able to acquire an F-117A Nighthawk, tail number 85-0817, donated from the United States Air Force. This aircraft was the first stealth fighter to be donated to a non-governmental museum and is currently being restored.

Collections 
The Air Zoo contains different archival collections. Since September 23, 1995, the Air Zoo is home to the Michigan Aviation Hall of Fame. It also holds the Guadalcanal Memorial Museum, which is sponsored and maintained by the Guadalcanal Campaign Veterans Association featuring information about the fighting on Guadalcanal during World War II.

Aircraft on display

 Aeronca 65CA Chief
 Aeronca L-3B Grasshopper
 Avid Flyer
 Beechcraft T-34 Mentor
 Bell AH-1J SeaCobra
 Bell TP-39Q Airacobra
 Boeing-Stearman N2S-5
 Boilerplate Gemini Test Vehicle
 Cessna L-19 Bird Dog
 Cirrus VK-30
 Curtiss Model D (Replica)
 Curtiss JN-4 (Scale Model)
 Curtiss P-40N Warhawk
 Curtiss Robin
 Curtiss XP-55 Ascender
 Douglas A4D Skyhawk
 Douglas AD-4NA Skyraider
 Douglas C-47 Skytrain
 Douglas SBD-3 Dauntless
 Fairchild 24K Forwarder
 Fokker Dr.I (Replica)
 Ford 5-AT
 Ford CG-4A
 General Motors FM-2 Wildcat
 Goodyear FG-1D Corsair
 Grumman F6F-5 Hellcat
 Grumman F11F Tiger
 Grumman F-14A Tomcat
 Grumman G-73 Mallard
 Grumman TF-9J Cougar
 Haigh SuperStar
 Heath Baby Bullet
 Heath Parasol
 Hiller OH-23 Raven
 Hiller UH-12A
 Hispano HA-1112-M1L Buchon
 Howard GH-2 Nightingale
 Howard PT-23
 Jodel D.92 Bébé
 Laister-Kauffman TG-4A
 Learjet 23
 Lockheed F-104C Starfighter
 Lockheed F-80C Shooting Star
 Lockheed P-38 Lightning (60% replica)
 Lockheed T-33A
 Lockheed S-3B Viking
 Lockheed SR-71B Blackbird
 Long Henderson HL-1 Longster
 Martin B-57B Canberra
 McDonnell Douglas F-4E Phantom II
 McDonnell Douglas F/A-18A Hornet
 Mikoyan-Gurevich MiG-21
 Murphy Renegade Spirit
 Naval Aircraft Factory N3N Canary
 North American AT-6G Texan
 North American B-25H Mitchell
 North American F-86F Sabre
 North American SNJ-5
 North American T-28 Trojan
 Osprey X-28A Sea Skimmer
 Piasecki HUP-3 Retriever
 Pietenpol Air Camper
 Piper L-4H Grasshopper
 Piper J-3 Cub
 Republic F-84F Thunderstreak
 Republic P-47D Thunderbolt
 RotorWay Exec 90
 Ryan PT-22 Recruit
 Schweizer LNS-1
 Sopwith F.1 Camel (Replica)
 SPAD S.VII (Replica)
 Sun Standard G Ratio 4:1 hang glider
 Timm N2T-1 Tutor
 Travel Air Type R Mystery Ship (Replica)
 Vought F-8J Crusader
 Vultee BT-13 Valiant
 WACO INF
 WACO VPF-7
 W.A.R. F4U Corsair
 Wolf W-11 Boredom Fighter
 WSK Mielec Lim-2

Aircraft under restoration 

 Douglas SBD-2P Dauntless
 General Motors FM-2 Wildcat
 Lockheed F-117 Nighthawk

See also 
 List of aerospace museums
 Suzanne Parish
 Women Airforce Service Pilots (WASPs)

References

Notes

Bibliography

External links 

 

Aerospace museums in Michigan
Museums in Kalamazoo County, Michigan
Museums established in 1977
1977 establishments in Michigan